Richard Allen Epstein (born April 17, 1943) is an American legal scholar known for his writings on torts, contracts, property rights, law and economics, classical liberalism, and libertarianism. He is the Laurence A. Tisch Professor of Law at New York University and the director of the university's Classical Liberal Institute. He also serves as the Peter and Kirsten Bedford Senior Fellow at the Hoover Institution and the James Parker Hall Distinguished Service Professor of Law emeritus and a senior lecturer at the University of Chicago.

According to James W. Ely Jr., Epstein's writings have had a "pervasive influence on American legal thought." In 2000, a study published in The Journal of Legal Studies identified Epstein as the 12th-most cited legal scholar of the 20th century; in 2008, he was chosen in a poll by Legal Affairs as one of the most influential modern legal thinkers. A study of legal publications between 2009 and 2013 found Epstein to be the third-most frequently cited American legal scholar during that period, behind only Cass Sunstein and Erwin Chemerinsky; in a 2021 examination by Fred R. Shapiro, Epstein was the fifth most-cited legal scholar of all time.

Early life and education
Epstein was born on April 17, 1943, in Brooklyn, New York. His grandparents were Ashkenazi Jews who immigrated to the United States from Russia and Austria in the early 20th century. Epstein's father, Bernard Epstein (19081978), was a radiologist, and his mother, Catherine Epstein (née Reiser; 19082004), managed his father's medical office. He has two sisters. He attended elementary school at P.S.161, a school that is now one of the Success Academy Charter Schools. Epstein and his family lived in Brooklyn until 1954, when his father began working at the Long Island Jewish Medical Center and their family moved to Great Neck, Long Island.

Epstein attended Columbia University as an undergraduate in the early 1960s. He had wide-ranging academic interests and did not wish to select a single major, obtaining special permission from the university to pursue a self-selected program of study across sociology, philosophy, and mathematics. He graduated with a B.A., summa cum laude, in 1964.

Epstein's undergraduate performance earned him a Kellett Fellowship, an award at Columbia that pays for two of each year's top graduates to spend two years in England studying at either Cambridge University or Oxford University; Epstein chose Oxford, where he studied jurisprudence at Oriel College. He received a B.A. with first-class honours in 1966. He then returned to the United States to attend Yale Law School; because he had an English law degree, Epstein entered Yale as a transfer student with second-year standing. He graduated in 1968 with an LL.B., cum laude.

Academic career
After graduating from law school, Epstein became an assistant professor at the Gould School of Law of the University of Southern California (USC). He taught at USC for four years before moving to the University of Chicago Law School in 1972. Epstein taught at Chicago for 38 years, eventually holding the title of James Parker Hall Distinguished Service Professor of Law. Epstein formally retired from Chicago in 2010, but quickly came out of retirement to join the faculty of the New York University School of Law as its inaugural Laurence A. Tisch Professor of Law. He remains a professor emeritus and senior lecturer at Chicago, occasionally teaching courses there. In 2013, NYU Law established a new academic research center, the Classical Liberal Institute, and named Epstein its inaugural director.

Since 2001, Epstein has served as the Peter and Kirsten Bedford Senior Fellow at the Hoover Institution, a prominent American public policy think tank at Stanford University. He has served in many academic and public organizations and has received a number of awards. In 1983, he was made a senior fellow at the Center for Clinical Medical Ethics at the University of Chicago Medical School, and, in 1985, he was inducted into the American Academy of Arts and Sciences. He was editor of the Journal of Legal Studies from 1981 to 1991, and of the Journal of Law and Economics from 1991 to 2001. In 2003, Epstein received an honorary LL.D. degree from the University of Ghent, and in 2018 he received an honorary doctorate in law from the University of Siegen. In 2005, the College of William & Mary awarded him the Brigham-Kanner Property Rights Prize for his contributions to the field of property rights. In 2011, he was awarded a Bradley Prize by the Bradley Foundation.

Writings
Epstein became famous in the American legal community in 1985 with Harvard University Press's publication of his book Takings: Private Property and the Power of Eminent Domain. In the book, Epstein argued that the "Takings Clause" of the Fifth Amendment to the U.S. Constitutionwhich reads, "nor shall private property be taken for public use, without just compensation", and is traditionally viewed as a limit on the governmental power of eminent domaingives constitutional protection to citizens' economic rights, and so requires the government to be regarded the same as any other private entity in a property dispute. The argument was controversial and sparked a great deal of debate on the interpretation of the takings clause after the book's publication. During Clarence Thomas's Supreme Court Justice confirmation hearings in 1991, then-Senator Joe Biden, "in a dramatic movement", held the book up and "repeatedly interrogated" Thomas about his position on the book's thesis. The book served as a focal point in the argument about the government's ability to control private property. It has also influenced how some courts view property rights and been cited by the U.S. Supreme Court four times, including in the 1992 case Lucas v. South Carolina Coastal Council.

At the height of the HIV pandemic in 1988, Epstein argued that companies ought to be able to discriminate against "AIDS carriers" and that anti-discrimination laws were unfair to employers. In place of such laws, Epstein argued that "AIDS carriers" ought to have their health insurance premiums subsidized via taxation so as to "discipline the behavior of government and interests groups, here by requiring citizens to make choices about how much they individually are prepared to pay to subsidize AIDS carriers." Furthermore, he argued that "[t]here is no reason to suppose that any public benefit obtained from having employers and their insurers care for AIDS victims will be at some level that matches the additional costs that are imposed." Instead, Epstein proposed that employers have the right to refuse to hire suspected "AIDS carriers".

Epstein is an advocate of minimal legal regulation. In his 1995 book Simple Rules for a Complex World, he consolidates much of his previous work and argues that simple rules work best because complexities create excessive costs. Complexity comes from attempting to do justice in individual cases. Complex rules are justifiable, however, if they can be opted out of. Drawing on Gary Becker, he argues that the Civil Rights Act and other anti-discrimination legislation ought to be repealed. Consistent with the principles of classical liberalism, he believes that the federal regulation on same-sex marriage, the Defense of Marriage Act, should be repealed, stating:

 "Under our law, only the state may issue marriage licenses. That power carries with it a duty to serve all-comers on equal terms, which means that the state should not be able to pick and choose those on whom it bestows its favors. DOMA offends this principle in two ways. First, it excludes polygamous couples from receiving these marital benefits. Second, it excludes gay couples. Both groups contribute to the funds that support these various government programs. Both should share in its benefits."

Epstein has criticized the Supreme Court ruling in Obergefell v. Hodges. In 2007, he defended the intellectual property rights of pharmaceutical companies against the cheaper, generic production of AIDS drugs, writing that "disregarding property rights in the name of human rights reduces human welfare around the globe".

In 2014, Epstein argued against reparations for African Americans in a piece published on the Hoover Institution's website.

Contributing to the anthology Our American Story (2019), Epstein addressed the possibility of a shared American narrative. Taking a decidedly skeptical approach, Epstein concluded that no new national narrative can be achieved "unless we engage in what I call American minimalism—a conscious reduction of the issues that we think are truly best handled as a nation and not better address by smaller subnational groups: states, local governments, and, most importantly, all sorts of small private organizations that are free to choose as they please in setting their own membership and mission."

COVID-19 pandemic
In March and April 2020, Epstein wrote several essays published by the Hoover Institution giving a contrarian account of the COVID-19 pandemic and warning against extensive containment and mitigative United States responses to the COVID-19 pandemic, which he called an "overreaction". In a piece published on March 16, he argued that the word "pandemic" is not to be used lightly and that the virus should be allowed to run its course, predicting there would be 500 U.S. deaths. In early June, the U.S. death total surpassed 100,000. On March 24, when U.S. deaths had already exceeded 500, Epstein added a "Correction & Addendum", in which he changed his forecast to 5,000 deaths without changing the underlying model that had led him to his first estimate. On April 6, when the death toll had already far surpassed his earlier predictions, he again revised that figure, with the "Correction & Addendum" section declaring under the inaccurate date stamp "March 24, 2020" that the "original erroneous estimate of 5,000 dead in the US [was] a number 10 times smaller than [he had] intended to state", implying that both "500" and "5,000" had been misprints for "50,000". After several news reports about Epstein's ever-increasing estimates, on April 21 an editor's note appeared on the website that explained the latest changes as an "editing error" and clarified that Epstein's original prediction had been 500 deaths. In December 2020, when the death toll from COVID-19 in the U.S. was over 333,000, Politico named Epstein's predictions among "the most audacious, confident and spectacularly incorrect prognostications about the year".

Epstein compared COVID-19 to the 2009 H1N1 pandemic and suggested that public health measures "are done better at the level of plants, hotels, restaurants, and schools than remotely by political leaders." He argued that "the response of the state governors to the coronavirus outbreak has become far more dangerous than the disease itself", writing that the number of deaths had been exaggerated. His essays, containing a number of factual errors and misconceptions about the SARS-CoV-2 virus, circulated in conservative circles and in the Trump administration upon their publication. In an article published on June 6, Epstein praised Republican-governed states like Florida for their crisis management, linking the then greater deaths in Democratic-governed states to their "interventionist policies".

Influence

In 2006, the American scholar James W. Ely Jr. wrote: "It is a widely accepted premise that Professor Richard A. Epstein has exercised a pervasive influence on American legal thought." In 2000, a study published in The Journal of Legal Studies identified Epstein as the 12th-most cited legal scholar of the entire 20th century. In 2008, he was chosen in a poll taken by Legal Affairs as one of the most influential legal thinkers of modern times. A study of legal publications between 2009 and 2013 found Epstein to be the 3rd most frequently cited American legal scholar, behind only Cass Sunstein and Erwin Chemerinsky.

Epstein's former students include a number of prominent judges, lawyers, and law professors, including Neomi Rao, Michael McConnell, Noel Francisco, Martha Pacold, and David McIntosh.

Politics
Epstein has said that when voting, he chooses "anyone but the Big Two" who are "just two members of the same statist party fighting over whose friends will get favors". He has voted Libertarian. Epstein says he is "certainly a Calvin Coolidge fan; he made some mistakes, but he was a small-government guy". Epstein served on The Constitution Project's Guantanamo Task Force. Epstein has said that Learned Hand should have been on the Supreme Court and that his favorite English judge was Baron Bramwell.

In early 2015, Epstein commented on his relationship to the modern American political landscape, stating: "I'm in this very strange position: I'm not a conservative when it comes to religious values and so forth, but I do believe, in effect, in a strong foreign policy and a relatively small domestic government, but that's not the same thing as saying I believe in no government at all." He has also been characterized as a libertarian conservative. During a debate with Chris Preble in December 2016, Epstein identified himself as being a "libertarian hawk".

In 2023, Epstein co-authored an op-ed in the Wall Street Journal defending the 2023 Israeli judicial reform.

Personal life
Epstein's wife, Eileen W. Epstein, is a fundraiser and educator who serves on the board of trustees for the philanthropic organization American Jewish World Service. They have three children: two sons, Benjamin M. and Elliot, and a daughter, Melissa. Epstein is a first cousin of the comedian and actor Paul Reiser.

Epstein, who had a bar mitzvah, has described himself as "a rather weak, non-practicing Jew."

Selected works

Articles

Books

Casebooks
  4th edition (1984), New York: Little, Brown & Co.

See also
 Libertarian theories of law

References
Footnotes

Works cited
 
 Anthony Ogus, 'The Power and Perils of Simple Ideas and Simple Rules' (1997) 17 (1) Oxford Journal of Legal Studies, reviewing Simple rules for a complex world

Further reading

External links

 A Richard Epstein fan site with links to his work
 Richard Epstein's Home Page at NYU Law
 Richard Epstein's Home Page at University of Chicago
 
 "Taking Exception", interview in Reason by Steve Chapman

 
 Interview with Richard Epstein , Hoover Institution's Uncommon Knowledge with Peter Robinson, October 29, 2006
 Forbes Magazine "The Libertarian" online column

1943 births
Living people
20th-century American lawyers
20th-century American male writers
20th-century American non-fiction writers
21st-century American lawyers
21st-century American male writers
21st-century American non-fiction writers
American book editors
American legal scholars
American legal writers
American male non-fiction writers
American political philosophers
American political writers
Cato Institute people
Columbia College (New York) alumni
Constitution Project
Federalist Society members
Fellows of the American Academy of Arts and Sciences
Hoover Institution people
Illinois Libertarians
Jewish American academics
Jewish American writers
Lawyers from Chicago
Libertarian theorists
Manhattan Institute for Policy Research
New York (state) Libertarians
New York University faculty
New York University School of Law faculty
University of Chicago faculty
University of Southern California faculty
Yale Law School alumni